The blue whale penis is the largest in the animal kingdom.

Morphology
The most common reported average length is roughly  but the average diameter is only , making the penis proportionately very long and thin.

"Average" for a blue whale penis, however, is difficult to gauge given that the penis is unlikely to be able to be measured during sexual intercourse. The penis of the blue whale is normally hidden inside its body and jets out through a genital slit during intercourse. They are stated to be tough and fibrous (more than in any other mammal). It is believed that it uses the elasticity of this tissue to get an erection and not from any blood flow, though this hypothesis has not been confirmed by any scientific study.

Scientific studies
With whales, the length of the penis can be an indication of the maturity of the organism. Sei whales for instance are divided into categories such as immature, pubertal and mature. However, length is not the only factor as it is recorded in relation to the size of the whale's testes and its histology. By comparison the average blue whale penis is nearly 3 times the size of that of a sei whale.

Largest specimen

See also
 Cetacean penises
 Largest body part

References

Further reading
 Bortolotti, Dan (2008). Wild Blue: A Natural History of the World's Largest Animal. Macmillan. p. 9.

External links
Photograph of the carcass of a 60 ft sperm whale in Taiwan, penis still intact 
Art of Angling by Richard Brookes, 1781, page 294: Penis of the Whale

Mammal penis
Cetacean anatomy
Blue whales